Reev Robledo is a music composer, songwriter, teacher and author. He has written various TV themes for networks ABS-CBN, GMA, TV5, JackTV, Velvet Channel, My Movie Channel and Balls. His first commercially released song "Paano Ang Pasko" won Best Christmas Recording in the 11th Awit Awards. In 2014, his first novel, Gitarista, won the Filipino Readers' Choice Awards for fiction in English.

TV themes

ABS-CBN
 Rated K (2011)
 ABS-CBN News Channel station ID (2010)
 Krusada (2010)
 Probe Profiles (2009)
 KNN Kabataan News Network (2006)

TV5
 Unang Tikim (2014)
 Bigtime (2014)
 Kaya (2014)
 Good Morning Club (2012)
 Pilipinas News (2012)
 Rescue 5 (2012)
 T3: Reload (2011)
 Alagang Kapatid (2011)
 Balitang 60 (2011))
 Balitaang Tapat (2011)
 Journo (2010)
 Kidztown (2001)

My Movie Channel
 My Movie Channel station ID (2014)

Jack TV
 JackTV station ID (2011)

Velvet Channel
 Velvet Channel station ID (2012)

Balls TV
 Balls (TV channel) station ID (2014)

GMA
 Txtube (2005)
 Fanatxt (2005)
 I-Witness (2002)
 Partners Mel and Jay (2002)

Books
 The Legend of The Cram (2014)
 Gitarista (2013)

Musicals
 The Testimonies (2009)
 Shepherd King, The Story of David (2006)

External links
 Official Website
 
 Best Christmas Song 11th Awit Awards
 Gitarista: Winner Fiction in English, Filipino Readers' Choice Awards 2014
 Reev Robledo's Goodreads Author Page
 Reev's Vimeo Channel
 Earth Hour Philippines Theme Song Composer "If We Try"
 Notable Manila Science Alumni

Living people
Filipino composers
Year of birth missing (living people)